Shahid-e Lefatah Kashtiban (also Romanized as Shahīd-e Lefatah Kashtībān) is a village in Anaqcheh Rural District, in the Central District of Ahvaz County, Khuzestan Province, Iran. At the 2006 census, its population was 14, in 4 families.

References 

Populated places in Ahvaz County